Randall Jerome Gay, Jr. (born May 5, 1982) is a former American football cornerback of the National Football League (NFL). He was signed by the New England Patriots as an undrafted free agent in 2004. He played college football at LSU.

Gay also played for the New Orleans Saints.  He played on a Super Bowl winning team with both the Patriots and the Saints, and is also noted for being one of the two Louisianan-born (other being former LSU and Saints teammate, Devery Henderson) having won a championship at both the college and pro level for teams of Louisiana, his home state.

Early years
At Brusly High School in Brusly, Louisiana, Randall Gay was a four-year letterman in football. He also lettered in weight lifting (three years) and track (one year). He was a first-team All-Metro selection, and a first-team All-District selection in football during his last two years of high school. As a senior, in only eight games, he rushed for 1,067 yards and 13 touchdowns, caught three touchdown passes, and returned two punts for touchdowns.

College career
He played college football at LSU. He won a BCS National Championship in 2003 with LSU as a nickel back.

Professional career

New England Patriots
On April 29, 2004, he was signed by the Patriots shortly after the NFL draft as an undrafted free agent.  His rookie year, Gay beat out cornerback Christian Morton, the Patriots' 7th-round draft pick, for a place on the roster. Later in the season, Gay was placed into the starting lineup because of injuries to veterans Ty Law and Tyrone Poole. Gay's rookie season concluded with a victory in Super Bowl XXXIX, in which he started opposite Asante Samuel where he was the leading tackler with 11 solo tackles. Gay was involved in several low level controversies as a Patriot: He failed to make a full contribution in 2005 and 2006, due to injuries that landed him on injured reserve. This led to some long running criticisms from the tough vocal New England fans and repeated questions about him on the region's talk shows and in the papers. Hence, after failing to deliver up to expectations of New England Patriots fans in both the 2005 and 2006 seasons,  before the 2007 training camp, Gay was quoted as saying:

Gay returned in 2007 and played primarily as a nickel back and a backup safety.  He did start several games, including the AFC Divisional Game against the Jacksonville Jaguars. Gay intercepted a career-high three passes while playing in every game of the 2007 season en route to a perfect regular season that ended with the Patriots' defeat at the hands of the New York Giants in Super Bowl XLII.

New Orleans Saints
On March 2, 2008, Gay signed a four-year, $17.8 million contract with the New Orleans Saints. The deal included a $3.75 million signing bonus and $6.9 million in guaranteed money. He was a member of the Saints' 2009 Super Bowl XLIV Championship team.  Gay suffered a concussion early in the 2010 season that eventually led to him being placed on injured reserve on October 20, 2010.

Gay was released by New Orleans on July 28, 2011, and retired thereafter.  In 2012, he was a named plaintiff in one of the lawsuits filed by former players against the NFL regarding the league's history of players suffering concussions.

Personal life
 Gay majored in marketing at LSU.
 Gay played both cornerback and safety, as he did against the Indianapolis Colts in 2005.
 After Super Bowl XXXIX, one of Gay's college professors attempted to order a replica jersey of her former student. The NFL Shop denied her request because the word "Gay" was on a blacklist of words considered related to drugs, sex, or gangs. After the incident was reported in the press, "Gay" was removed from the banned name list because it is the actual name of an NFL player.
 Randall and his wife, Desha, have two sons.  After Gay's retirement, he and Desha decided to go to law school together. In 2015, they both graduated from Southern University Law Center in Baton Rouge.

References

External links
 New England Patriots bio
 New Orleans Saints bio

1982 births
Living people
Players of American football from Baton Rouge, Louisiana
People from West Baton Rouge Parish, Louisiana
American football cornerbacks
LSU Tigers football players
New England Patriots players
New Orleans Saints players